Houen zo!  is a 1953 Dutch short documentary film directed by  about the reconstruction of Rotterdam, following the city's destruction by the Nazis in the Rotterdam Blitz.

External links

1953 films
Black-and-white documentary films
Dutch short documentary films
1953 documentary films
History of Rotterdam
Documentary films about World War II
Netherlands in World War II
Films shot in Rotterdam
1950s short documentary films
Dutch black-and-white films
1950s Dutch-language films